Tatchanon Nakarawong (born 18 November 1996) is a Thai professional footballer who plays as a midfielder for Thai League 2 club Phrae United.

Honours

Club
Chiangrai United
 Thailand Champions Cup (1): 2020

External links
Tatchanon Nakarawong at Soccerway

1996 births
Living people
Tatchanon Nakarawong
Tatchanon Nakarawong
Association football midfielders
Tatchanon Nakarawong
Tatchanon Nakarawong
Tatchanon Nakarawong
Tatchanon Nakarawong
Tatchanon Nakarawong
Tatchanon Nakarawong
Tatchanon Nakarawong
Tatchanon Nakarawong